3.0 may refer to:

Music 
 3.0 (Marc Anthony album), 2013
 3.0 (Chicago Poodle album), 2013
 3.0 (Safri Duo album), 2003

Other uses 
 3.0 (professional wrestling), professional wrestling tag team
 BMW 3.0, car

See also
 
 
 Version 3.0, 2009 album by Marie-Mai